The following is a list of colleges, seminaries and universities owned and operated by the Seventh-day Adventist Church (with exceptions noted).

Africa

 Cosendai Adventist University, Yaoundé, Cameroon
 Adventist University of Africa, Nairobi, Kenya
 Adventist University of Central Africa, Kigali, Rwanda
 Adventist University of West Congo, Kinshasa, Democratic Republic of the Congo
 Adventist University of Lukanga, Butembo, North Kivu, Democratic Republic of the Congo
 Adventist University of West Africa, Monrovia, Liberia
 Angola Adventist University, Mbongo, Angola
 Adventist College of Education, Asokore, Ghana
 Babcock University, Ogun State, Nigeria
 Bugema University, Kampala, Uganda
 Chegutu Adventist University, Zimbabwe Being built
 Clifford University, Abia State, Nigeria
 Ethiopian Adventist College, Ethiopia
 Adventist University of Goma, Goma, Democratic Republic of the Congo
 Helderberg College of Higher Education, Somerset West, South Africa
 Kamagambo Adventist College, Kisii, Kenya
 Kanye Seventh-day Adventist College of Nursing, Kanye, Botswana
 Malawi Adventist University (formerly Lakeview College), Ntcheu, Malawi
 Nyanchwa Adventist Teachers College, Kenya
 Philip Lemon University, Lubumbashi, Democratic Republic of the Congo
 Rusangu University, Monze, Zambia
 Solusi University, Bulawayo, Zimbabwe
 Université Adventiste Zurcher, Sambaina, Antsirabe, Madagascar
 University of Arusha, Arusha, Tanzania
 University of Eastern Africa, Baraton, Eldoret, Kenya
 Valley View University, Oyibi, Ghana

Not Church owned, but closely aligned with the Seventh-day Adventist Church:
 University of Lay Adventists of Kigali, Kigali, Rwanda
 Adeleke University, Osun State, Nigeria

Europe
 Adventist University of France – Collonges, France
 Hungarian Adventist Theological College, Hungary
 Adriatic Union College, Croatia
 Swedish Junior College, Sweden
 Italian Adventist College Villa Aurora, Italy
 Romanian Adventus University from Cernica, Romania
 Newbold College of Higher Education, United Kingdom
 Romanian Adventist College of Health, Romania
 Romanian Adventist Nursing School, Romania
 Finland Junior College, Finland
 Friedensau Adventist University, Germany
 Norwegian Junior College, Norway
 Danish Junior College, Denmark
 The Polish College of Theology and Humanities, Poland

Middle East 
 Middle East University, Lebanon

Euro-Asia Division
 Ukrainian Institute of Arts and Sciences, Ukraine
 Zaoksky Adventist University, Russia

North America Division
 AdventHealth University, Orlando, Florida, United States
 Andrews University, Berrien Springs, Michigan, United States
 Atlantic Union College, South Lancaster, Massachusetts, United States 
 Burman University, Lacombe, Alberta, Canada
 Griggs University, Berrien Springs, Michigan, United States (University level distance learning, merged with Andrews University in 2013) 
 Kettering College, Kettering, Ohio, United States 
 La Sierra University, Riverside, California, United States
 Loma Linda University, Loma Linda, California, United States
 Oakwood University, Huntsville, Alabama, United States
 Pacific Union College, Angwin, California, United States
 Southern Adventist University, Collegedale, Tennessee, United States
 Southwestern Adventist University, Keene, Texas, United States
 Union College, Lincoln, Nebraska, United States
 Walla Walla University, College Place, Washington, United States
 Washington Adventist University, Takoma Park, Maryland, United States

Not Church owned, but closely aligned with the Seventh-day Adventist Church:
 Hartland College, a division of Hartland Institute, Rapidan, Virginia, United States
 Middle Tennessee School of Anesthesia, Madison, Tennessee, United States
 Ouachita Hills College, Amity, Arkansas, United States
 Weimar University, Weimar, California, United States
 Wildwood College, Wildwood, Georgia, United States

Inter-America Division 
 Belize Adventist Junior College, Corozal Town, Belize
 Venezuelan Adventist University, Venezuela
 Inter-American Adventist Theological Seminary, Florida, United States 
 Northern Caribbean University, Mandeville, Jamaica
 Cuba Adventist Theological Seminary, Cuba
 Antillean Adventist University, Mayagüez, Puerto Rico
 Central American Adventist University, Costa Rica
 Colombia Adventist University, Colombia
 Dominican Adventist University, Dominican Republic
 Instituto Universitario del Sureste, Yucatán, México
 University of Montemorelos, Montemorelos, Nuevo León, Mexico
 Instituto Universitario del Sureste, Tabasco, México
 University of Navojoa, Navojoa, Sonora, Mexico
 Herbert Fletcher University, Mayagüez, Puerto Rico
 Linda Vista University, Pueblo Nuevo, Chiapas, Mexico
 Adventist University of Haiti, Carrefour area of Port-au-Prince, Haiti
 University of the Southern Caribbean, Maracas Valley, Trinidad and Tobago

South American Division 
 São Paulo Adventist University Campus 1, Brazil
 São Paulo Adventist University Campus 2, Brazil
 São Paulo Adventist University Campus 3, Brazil
 Amazonia Adventist College, Brazil
 Northeast Brazil College, Brazil
 Minas Adventist College, Brazil
 Paraná Adventist College, Brazil
 Ecuador Adventist Technical Institute, Santo Domingo de los Tsáchilas, Ecuador
 Adventist Institute of Uruguay, Canelones, Uruguay
 Misiones Adventist College, Misiones, Argentina
 Latin-American Adventist Theological Seminary, Brazil
 Bolivia Adventist University, Cochabamba, Bolivia
 Chile Adventist University, Chillan, Chile
 River Plate Adventist University, Entre Ríos, Argentina
 Peruvian Union University Campus 1, Juliaca, Peru
 Peruvian Union University Campus 2, Lima, Peru
 Peruvian Union University Campus 3, Tarapoto, Peru

Southern Asia Division
 Bangladesh Adventist Seminary & College, Dhaka, Bangladesh
 Flaiz Adventist College, Narsapur, India
 Hume McHenry Memorial High School and Jr. College, Pune, India
 Helen Lowry College of Arts & Commerce, Aizawl, India
 Lakpahana Adventist College and Seminary, Sri Lanka
 Adventist International School, Sri Lanka
 Lowry Memorial College & Group of Institutions, Bangaluru, India
 METAS of Seventh-day Adventist Colleges, Surat, India
 Northeast Adventist University, Jowai, India
 Pakistan Adventist Seminary & College, Pakistan
 Roorkee Adventist College, Roorkee, India
 Seventh-day Adventist College of Education, Vellore, Tamil Nadu, India
 Spicer Adventist University, Pune, India
 Seventh Day Adventist College of Nursing, Ottapalam, Kerala, India

Southern Asia-Pacific Division
 Adventist College of Nursing and Health Sciences, Penang, Malaysia
 Adventist International Institute of Advanced Studies, Lalaan, Silang, Cavite, Philippines
 Adventist University of the Philippines,  Kahoy, Silang, Cavite, Philippines
 Asia-Pacific International University (formerly Mission College), Muak Lek, Saraburi Province, Thailand
 Central Philippine Adventist College, Murcia, Negros Occidental, Philippines
 Indonesian Adventist University, Parongpong, Bandung, Indonesia
 Manila Adventist College, Pasay, Philippines
 McNeilus Maranatha Christian College, Kalaymyo, Myanmar
 Adventist Medical Center College – Iligan, Inc., Iligan City, Lanao del Norte, Philippines
 Mountain View College, Valencia City, Bukidnon, Philippines
 Myanmar Union Adventist Seminary, Myaungmya, Myanmar
 Naga View Adventist College, Panicuason, Naga City, Camarines Sur, Philippines
 Northeast Luzon Adventist College, Mabini, Alicia, Isabela, Philippines
 Northern Luzon Adventist College, Artacho, Sison, Pangasinan, Philippines
 Palawan Adventist Medical Center and Colleges, Puerto Princesa, Palawan, Philippines
 Philippine Advent College, Magsaysay, Sindangan, Zamboanga del Norte, Philippines
 South Philippine Adventist College, Camanchiles, Matanao, Davao del Sur, Philippines
 Surya Nusantara Adventist College, Pematang Siantar, North Sumatra, Indonesia
 Klabat University, Airmadidi, North Sulawesi, Indonesia

Northern Asia-Pacific Division
 Hong Kong Adventist College, Sai Kung, New Territories, Hong Kong, China 
 Sahmyook Bogeon Daehakgyo (Sahmyook Health University College), South Korea
 Sahmyook University, Nowon-gu, Seoul, South Korea
 Saniku Gakuin College, Isumi-gun, Chiba-ken, Japan
 Taiwan Adventist College, Nantou County, Taiwan

South Pacific Division
 Avondale University, Cooranbong, Lake Macquarie, New South Wales, Australia
 Fulton Adventist University College, Nadi, Fiji
 Mamarapha College, Karragullen, Western Australia, Australia
 Pacific Adventist University, Port Moresby, Papua New Guinea
 Sonoma Adventist College, Kokopo, East New Britain, Papua New Guinea
Atoifi Adventist College of Nursing, Malaita Province, Solomon Islands.

See also
 Christian school
 List of Seventh-day Adventist hospitals
 List of Seventh-day Adventist secondary schools
 Seventh-day Adventist Church

References

Sources
Much of this information (particularly the location information) was taken from sites of the Seventh-day Adventist Church, such as the site below.
 List of Adventist colleges and universities by divisions of the Adventist Church 
 Search for a school nearby
 Adventist Directory

Lists of Christian universities and colleges
Colleges and universities